Garfield Wilson Weede (November 26, 1880 – November 21, 1971) was an American football, basketball, and track and field coach and athletic director. He was one of the first college coaches to "break the color line" and allow racial integration among his players.

Playing career
Garfield Weede played football at Cooper Memorial College—now known as Sterling College—as a quarterback from 1898 to 1900. He then played at the University of Pennsylvania as an end and placekicker. He was severely injured in a game in October 1905. Under head coach Carl S. Williams, the team was undefeated in 1904 with a record of 12–0 and has since retroactively been declared "national champions" for that year.

Coaching career

Washburn
Weede was the tenth head football coach for Washburn University in Topeka, Kansas, as well as the athletic director. He held the position for three seasons, from 1906 until 1908, and followed John H. Outland. Weede's coaching record at Washburn was 20–6–4. Football legend Walter Camp called him a "familiar winner" in one of his reviews of the program and his 1907 team finished the season undefeated and untied with victories of Kansas State, Kansas, and Oklahoma.

Cooper
Weede next became the head football coach at Cooper Memorial College—now known as Sterling College—in Sterling, Kansas. He held that position for nine seasons, from 1910 until 1918. His coaching record at Cooper was 21–25–3. Weede is a member of the Sterling College Athletic Hall of Fame.

Pittsburg State
In 1919, "Doc" Weede was hired as coach of all sports and director of athletics at Pittsburg Manual Training Normal in Pittsburg, Kansas. He coached the football team to a 46–33–7 record from 1919 to 1928 including the school's first undefeated team in 1924. That year, his team was declared Kansas Collegiate Athletic Conference champions.

Doc Weede ended his football coaching career on a downturn, losing every game of his final season of 1928. His squad only scored in two of seven games and allowed a total of 113 points.

Legacy
Weede was inducted in the Kansas Sports Hall of Fame in 1961. Although he spent most of his time and efforts in college athletics, he also was a dentist, having earned a Doctor of Dental Surgery from the University of Pennsylvania in 1906.

Head coaching record

Football

References

External links

1880 births
1971 deaths
American football ends
Basketball coaches from Iowa
Penn Quakers football players
Pittsburg State Gorillas athletic directors
Pittsburg State Gorillas football coaches
Pittsburg State Gorillas men's basketball coaches
Sterling Warriors football coaches
Washburn Ichabods football coaches
Washburn Ichabods athletic directors
College track and field coaches in the United States
People from Burlington, Iowa
University of Pennsylvania School of Dental Medicine alumni